Goicoechea, also spelled various other ways (although similarly pronounced) and all derived from the original Basque Goikoetxea, is a Spanish and Latin American surname.

It may refer to:

People

Football players 

 Andoni Goikoetxea Olaskoaga (born 1956), Spanish Basque football player and coach
 Ion Andoni Goikoetxea (born 1965), Spanish Basque-Navarrese football player and later coach; FC Barcelona Dream Team member
 Mauro Goicoechea (born 1988), Uruguayan football player
Mikel Lasa Goicoechea (born 1971), Basque football player
Sergio Goycochea (born 1963), Argentine football player

Other 

Alejandro Goicoechea (1895-1984), co-founder of the Spanish company Talgo
Ángel Suquía Goicoechea (1916-2006), Roman Catholic archbishop in Madrid
Felipe de Goicoechea (1747-1814), Mexican former comandante of the Presidio of Santa Barbara and governor of the province of Baja California
Florentino Goikoetxea (1898-1980), Basque guide who led downed Allied airmen to safety in Spain during World War II
Jacinto Argaya Goicoechea (1903-1993), Basque Roman Catholic bishop
Julen Goikoetxea (1985-2006), Basque cyclist
Yannick Goïcoëchea (born 1965), French ice hockey player
Yon Goicoechea (born 1984), Venezuelan political activist

Places
Goicoechea (canton) in San José, Costa Rica

See also
Talgo, "Tren Articulado Ligero Goicoechea Oriol" (Goicoechea-Oriol light articulated train)

Basque-language surnames